Sorento may refer to:

 The Kia Sorento, automobile
 Sorento, Illinois, United States

See also 
 Sorrento (disambiguation)